The 2010–11 Copa del Rey was the 1st staging of the Copa del Rey de Futsal. The competition began on December 8, 2010 and ended on May 7, 2011. The final was held at Pabellón Municipal Javier Lozano in Toledo.

Calendar

Qualified teams
16 clubs of División de Honor
14 clubs of División de Plata
18 clubs of Primera Nacional

First round
Matches played on 8 December 2010.

Second round
Matches played on 22 December 2010.

Third round
Matches played on 29 December 2010.

Final phase bracket

Final

References

 rfef.es
 lnfs.es

Copa del Rey de Futsal seasons
Copa
Fut